Navv Inder is an Indian R&B singer.  In collaboration with rapper Badshah, Inder's song "Wakhra Swag" won the 2016 Punjabi Music Awards for best duo/group and most popular song of the year.  "Wakhra Swag" had more than 260 million hits on YouTube in may 2020.

Early Life 
He was born in Gurusar Sudhar, Ludhiana. He did his Master of Business Administration in finance from Chandigarh University.

Career 
He recreated The Wakhra song for the film Judgementall Hai Kya. The song sung by him along with Lisa Mishra and Raja Kumari features the lead characters Kangana Ranaut and Rajkumar Rao. The song marks his debut as a playback singer for Hindi films.

Discography

Singles

Extended plays 

 Kaafila (2018)

Film Soundtrack

References

External links 

 
 Navv Inder on Instagram

21st-century Indian singers
Indian male singer-songwriters
Indian singer-songwriters
Living people
20th-century births
People from Ludhiana district
Singers from Punjab, India
21st-century Indian male singers
Year of birth missing (living people)